John Lynch (2 May 1890 – 6 November 1930) was an Irish Gaelic footballer who played for Cork Senior Championship club Macroom. He played for the Cork senior football team for five seasons, during which time he usually lined out as a right corner-back.

Honours

Macroom
Cork Senior Football Championship (4): 1909, 1910, 1912, 1913

Cork
All-Ireland Senior Football Championship (1): 1911
Munster Senior Football Championship (1): 1911

References

1890 births
1930 deaths
Macroom Gaelic footballers
Cork inter-county Gaelic footballers
Winners of one All-Ireland medal (Gaelic football)